Ali Hoseyna (also Romanized as ‘Alī Ḩoseynā; also known as Deh-e ‘Alī Ḩoseynā) is a village in Dust Mohammad Rural District, in the Central District of Hirmand County, Sistan and Baluchestan Province, Iran. At the 2006 census, its population was 636, in 136 families.

References 

Populated places in Hirmand County